KTBZ-FM (94.5 MHz) is a commercial active/alternative rock radio station licensed to Houston, Texas.  Owned by iHeartMedia, the station serves Greater Houston. The KTBZ-FM studios are located in Uptown Houston, while the station transmitter is located near Missouri City, Texas; KTBZ-FM has an effective radiated power of 100,000 watts.

KTBZ-FM broadcasts in the HD Radio format, with its HD2 subchannel carrying a simulcast of co-owned KBME "Sportstalk 790", and its HD3 subchannel carrying a simulcast of co-owned KPRC.

History
The station first signed on the air October 15, 1960 as KARO.  The station was owned by San Diego-based Multi Casting, Inc. and broadcast at only 7,600 watts.  In 1964, the station got an increase in power, first to 12,500 watts, and later to 45,000 watts, under the ownership of Apollo Broadcasting.  In 1969, the station was acquired by Entertainment Communications, Inc., which later became Entercom, and is now known as Audacy.

The station would switch to classical music as KLEF, which stood for Clef, a musical symbol used to denote pitch in sheet music.  KLEF was Houston's leading classical outlet for 22 years. The station got a boost to 100,000 watts effective radiated power (ERP), covering much of Southeast Texas.  By the mid-1980s, interest in classical music had declined and management decided to go with a more mass-appeal format.

On March 13, 1986, the station became KJYY, "Joy 95", with a soft adult contemporary format.  Then in 1988, it became KLDE, branded as "Oldies 94.5." At the time, the station was owned by Entercom.  The station was operated under the direction of a variety of program directors, including RC Rogers, Bob Harlow, Dennis Winslow, Ron Parker, and Ed Scarborough. Past general managers include Steve Shepard, Chris McMurray, Chris Wegman, and Caroline Devine.

Bonneville International later bought the station, with AM/FM, Inc. taking over in 1998.

Due to the 2000 merger of Clear Channel Communications (now iHeartMedia) and AM/FM, Inc., and the need to stay within the Federal Communications Commission's station ownership cap, KLDE's intellectual property was sold to Cox Radio, for the 107.5 frequency, which at the time aired an alternative rock format as "The Buzz", KTBZ.

It was announced and understood that KLDE's format would stay intact with the ownership change and frequency move.  However, on-air personalities continually announced that "The Buzz" would cease operations at 107.5 on July 18 and began a "Save the Buzz" campaign, sending Buzz listeners looking for information on the station's "impending demise" of the alternative format.

When the actual purpose of the "Save the Buzz" campaign was discovered to be a marketing ploy, an online forum maintained by KTBZ was shut down in order to attempt to keep the information from spreading as concerned listeners began to post their findings. Regardless, it did not prevent listeners from distributing banners throughout Houston and painting "Save The Buzz" slogans on car windows throughout the City.

A few weeks prior to the pending July 18 switch, KTBZ staged a public rally, at which a representative from parent company Clear Channel Radio came to read a statement. The representative said in response to the overwhelming response of listeners and the general community, The Buzz would be saved due to the public outcry, moving to KLDE's 94.5 FM facility, promoting a much stronger signal for the alternative format, creating the marketing strategy of a "Bigger, Better Buzz".

Just before 8:00 p.m. on July 18, 2000, KTBZ and KLDE each played a pre-recorded lead-in to the station switch. KLDE had their air staff riding in a transporter across the dial to 107.5 FM, while KTBZ led a one-minute countdown as they "faded" off of the 107.5 frequency. At exactly 8:00 p.m., the stations simultaneously exchanged frequencies; KTBZ's montage led in with "Turn on the Juice!", while KLDE's air staff "crash-landed" on 107.5. Both stations celebrated the move with their own "Switch Parties"; The Buzz presented a free concert starring Stone Temple Pilots that was broadcast live on air from The Aerial Theater in downtown Houston as "94.5 The Buzz", while "Oldies 107.5" marked the transition by playing 48 hours of non-stop music. This officially completed the "trade" in ownership.

On January 11, 2001, KTBZ was modified to KTBZ-FM, as a similarly branded, co-owned sports radio station in Tulsa became KTBZ.

The current weekday on-air lineup includes The Rod Ryan Show on mornings, Jeremy on middays, Theresa on afternoon drive, and Karah Leigh at night.

KTBZ-FM HD subchannels
KTBZ-FM began transmitting in the HD Radio hybrid format in January 2006.  KTBZ-FM-HD2 has gone through three different format changes:  from 2006 to 2009, it was alternative rock "Liquid Buzz" (with a different playlist from the main station). From 2009 to 2015, it was "94-5 The Rock, Houston's Rock Station", playing active rock and classic rock. In 2015, KTBZ-FM-HD2 flipped to Regional Mexican music as "La Mejor", and began simulcasting on FM translator K283CH (104.5 FM). On September 7, 2017, at 9 a.m., KTBZ-FM HD2 dropped the 104.5 translator, and began retransmitting on two co-owned translators on the 102.5 frequency, K273AL (licensed to Porter) and K273CW (licensed to Houston). 104.5 switched to an urban AC format, branded as "104.5 KISS-FM", and relayed by iHeartMedia sister station KQBT HD-2.

"La Mejor", which was a simulcast of KJOZ, moved to the newly created HD3 channel of KTBZ-FM, while the HD2 channel began airing a simulcast of sports radio-formatted KBME. KTBZ-FM HD3 was being used to feed Centro Cristiano de Vida Eterna's FM translator 105.3 K287BQ.  However, the translator has been taken silent and has an application to move its transmission site to a location in southwest Houston, due to several complaints filed by co-channel KTWL owner Roy E. Henderson, and numerous citizens within the protected contour of the full power facility.  This forced the FCC to require Centro Cristiano de Vida Eterna to take the translator off the air until the interference was eliminated.

As of October 18, 2018, an Informal Objection was filed with the FCC by James B. Davis, of Cypress, Texas, regarding the proposed move of K287BQ to the new location. Davis' claim is that K287BQ would still interfere with the KTWL protected contour at the new site, and asks for the Commission to require the translator to move off of channel 287 (105.3 MHz) entirely. As there is no open channel/frequency available in the immediate Houston area for the translator to move to without causing interference to another established licensed facility, a frequency change would likely prove difficult for the owners.

Centro Cristiano de Vida Eterna is facing similar interference complaints against co-owned translator 103.5 K278CR, also licensed in Houston, due to interference issues with low powered facility KCYB-LP, licensed to Cypress, and an Informal Objection has also been filed by Davis to keep the group from purchasing a full powered facility west of Houston, licensed as KJJB in Eagle Lake, on the grounds that the facility's broadcasting activities in question have existed since licensed.

KTBZ-FM-HD3 has since flipped to a simulcast of co-owned talk radio station KPRC.

Buzzfest
Initially, once a year, KTBZ-FM promotes a live concert, originally called the Buzz Festival, now known as Buzzfest. In 2001, Buzzfest moved to twice a year, with one show in the Spring and the other taking place in the Fall of each year.

Buzzfest performers:
1995: Bush, Our Lady Peace, Matthew Sweet, No Use for a Name, Ned's Atomic Dustbin, The Nixon's, Maids of Gravity, Face to Face, POL, Phunk Junkeez
1996: Toadies, The Hunger, God Lives Under Water, Gravity Kills, The Nixon's, Lush, 22 Brides, Atticus Finch, Poe, Too Much Joy, Modern English
1997: Matchbox Twenty, Silverchair, Buck O' Nine, Cowboy Mouth, 7 Mary 3, Abra Moore, Artificial Joy Club, Old 97's
1998: Spacehog, Foo Fighters, Our Lady Peace, Creed, The Hunger, Black Lab, Big Wreck, Mighty Joe Plumb, Cool for August, Athenaeum, Los Skarnales, Riverfenix, Bluebird, Train in Vain, Face Plant
1999: Collective Soul, Eve 6, Better than Ezra, The Flys, Soul Coughing, Sponge, Jude, My Friend Steve, Tin Star, Chlorine, Lit, Tommy Hendrickson, Train, GPR
2000: Third Eye Blind, Lit, Tonic, The Flys, Oleander, Stroke 9, Owlsey, Radford, Stir, Frankie Machine, Peter Searcy, Papa Roach, Joe 90, Mars Electric
2001 - Spring: Offspring, Linkin Park, Eve 6, Train, Oleander, Orgy, Spacehog, Dust for Life, Dexter Freebish, Electracy, Lucky Boys Confusion
2001 - Fall: Fuel, Nickelback, Saliva, Alien Ant Farm, Tantric, Joy Drop, The Calling, Remy Zero, Bliss 66, 8 Stops 7, Default, Transmatic, Apex Theory, Pressure 4-5
2002 - Spring: P.O.D., Puddle of Mudd, Sum 41, Drowning Pool, Unwritten Law, Adema, Gravity Kills, Pressure 4-5, Earshot, Mest, Course of Nature, Abandoned Pools, Trik Turner, 30 Seconds to Mars
2002 - Fall: Everclear, Boxcar Racer, Hoobastank, Saliva, Earshot, Greenwheel, Sugarcult, Seether, Audiovent, OK Go, The Used, The Exies, H2O, Hometown Hero
2003 - Spring: Godsmack, Stone Sour, Seether, Taproot, Evanescence, The Used, Maroon 5, The Exies, Powerman 5000, All American Rejects, Breaking Benjamin, Trapt, Systematic, Skrape, Off by One, RA
2003 - Fall: Staind, Fuel, Trapt, The Ataris, Eve 6, Alien Ant Farm, Fountains of Wayne, Vendetta Red, Static X, Smile Empty Soul, Socialburn, Switchfoot, Billy Talent, Yellowcard, 3 Days Grace
2004 - Spring: Puddle of Mudd, Trapt, Hoobastank, Sevendust, Everlast, 3 Days Grace, Thrice, Lo Pro, Thornley, IMA Robot, Strata, Cold, Drowning Pool, Smile Empty Soul, Finger Eleven, Lost Prophets, Marcy Playground
2004 - Fall: Velvet Revolver, Chevelle, Seether, Shinedown, Breaking Benjamin, Story of the Year, Riddlin Kids, Papa Roach, Authority Zero, Earshot, Skindred, The Exies, My Chemical Romance, Burden Brothers, The Vanished
2005 - Spring: 3 Doors Down, Mudvayne, Trust Company, The Used, Wakefield, Papa Roach, Unwritten Law, Alter Bridge, No Address, Snow Patrol, Sum 41, Breaking Benjamin, Theory of a Deadman, The Exies, Glass Intrepid
2005 - Fall Buzzfest was supposed to be held at Minute Maid Park, but because the Houston Astros advanced to the 2005 World Series that was held at the same time, it was moved to the Cynthia Woods Mitchell Pavilion in The Woodlands. This turned out to be a major problem for the public, because the Woodlands could not honor the tickets sold for Minute Maid Park. Fans had to turn in their Minute Maid Park tickets for refunds, and then make the additional effort to purchase Woodlands tickets, with the change of venue announced less than one week before the concert. Performers were: Audioslave, Nickelback, Seether, Cold, 10 Years, Institute, 30 Seconds to Mars, Hinder, Boys Night Out, Fallout Boy, Bloodhound Gang, Yellowcard, Coheed & Cambria, Vaux, Dredg, The Starting Line, Motion City Soundtrack, Panic! At the Disco
2006 - Spring: Staind, Shinedown, Blue October, 10 Years, Evans Blue, People in Plains, Huck Johns, Hoobastank, Trapt, Three Days Grace, Hinder, Buckcherry, Candlebox, Bril, Hurt
2006 - Fall: Alice in Chains, Breaking Benjamin, Lostprophets, Panic Channel, Hurt, 18 Visions, Stone Sour, Evans Blue, Crossfade, Everclear, Red Jumpsuit Apparatus, OK Go, Boys Like Girls
2007 - Spring: Seether, Puddle of Mudd, Three Days Grace, Papa Roach, Hinder, Jet, Chevelle, Smile Empty Soul, Blue October, Buckcherry, Finger Eleven, Red Jumpsuit Apparatus, Saosin, The Exies, The Vanished, Autovein
2007 - Fall: Smashing Pumpkins, Finger Eleven, Chris Cornell, Earshot, Evanescence, The Bravery, Evans Blue, The Starting Line, Alter Bridge, Sick Puppies, Sum 41, Fair to Midland, Fuel

BuzzFest XXII was scheduled for October 26, 2008.  The extensive artist lineup included such names as The Offspring, Staind, Seether, Papa Roach, Puddle of Mudd, 10 Years and more. However, due to extensive damage to the Cynthia Woods Mitchell Pavilion caused by Hurricane Ike, the show was forced to be canceled.

2013 - Spring (Buzzfest 30): Shinedown, Bush, Stone Sour, Papa Roach, P.O.D., Sick Puppies, Hollywood Undead, The Dirty Heads, Oleander, IAmDynamite, A Silent Film, The Virgin Mary's, Youngblood Hawk, Beware of Darkness
2013 - Fall (Buzzfest 31): Stone Temple Pilots with Chester Bennington, Chevelle, Cage the Elephant, Blue October, The Dirty Heads, 10 Years, The Mowgli's, Oleander, New Politics, Middle Class Rut, IAmDynamite, The Virgin Marys, Nico Vega
2014 - Fall (Buzzfest 32): Chevelle, P.O.D., Papa Roach, The Dirty Heads, Cage the Elephant, Evans Blue, Young the Giant, New Politics, Switchfoot, Bear Hands, Big Data, Bad Suns, Milky Chance, New Medicine
2015 - Spring (Buzzfest 33): Godsmack, The Dirty Heads, Breaking Benjamin, Holywood Undead, AWOLNATION, New Politics, Buckcherry, Robert DeLong, Joywave, Art Alexakis, Young Guns, IAmDynamite, Not In The Face, Within Reason
2015 - Fall (Buzzfest 34): Papa Roach, Bring Me the Horizon, Our Lady Peace, Yelawolf, P.O.D., Pop Evil, Panic! at the Disco, Candlebox, Big Wreck, Atlas Genius, The Struts, Issues, Wolf Alice, Pvris
2016 - Spring (Buzzfest 35): Cage the Elephant, AWOLNATION, The Offspring, Fitz and the Tantrums, Blue October, Everclear, Toadies, The Struts, Joy Formidable, Big Data, Nothing But Thieves, New Beat Fund, Andrew Wyatt

2017 - Spring (Buzzfest 36): Godsmack, Breaking Benjamin, Toadies, Filter, Red Sun Rising, Missio, Badflower, P.O.D., New Politics, Highly Suspect, PVRIS, The Unlikely Candidates, Dreamers, Bleeker.

2018 - Fall (Buzzfest 37): A Perfect Circle, Dirty Heads, Chevelle, Mike Shinoda, Scott Stapp, Puddle of Mudd, The Struts, The Nixons, Badflower, The Blue Stones, Grandson, Hold On Hollywood, Bear Hands, Kulick

Call sign history
KARO:10/1960
KLEF-FM: 10/21/1964
KJYY: 3/13/1986 (Joy 94)
KLDE: 4/29/1988 (Oldies 94.5)
KTBZ: 7/18/2000 (94-5 The Buzz)
KTBZ-FM: 1/11/2001 (94-5 The Buzz)

Awards
In 2007, the station was nominated for the top 25 markets "Alternative Station of the Year" award by Radio & Records magazine.
Other nominees included WBCN in Boston; KROQ-FM in Los Angeles; KITS, in San Francisco; KNDD in Seattle; and WWDC in Washington, D.C.

References

External links

KTBZ legal ID/May 2006 -from Tophour.com

Modern rock radio stations in the United States
Nationwide Communications
Radio stations established in 1964
TBZ-FM
IHeartMedia radio stations